The 2000–01 snooker season was a series of snooker tournaments played between 26 August 2000 and 13 May 2001. The following table outlines the results for the ranking and invitational events.


Calendar

Official rankings 

The top 16 of the world rankings, these players automatically played in the final rounds of the world ranking events and were invited for the Masters.

Notes

References

External links

2000
Season 2001
Season 2000